Something Something 2 is a 2014 Oriya language romantic comedy film starring Anubhav Mohanty and Barsha Priyadarshini in the lead roles. It was directed by Sudhakar Vasanth and produced under the banner of Vishnupriya Art and Graphics by Anuprash Mohanty and released on 14 June 2014. The film is sequel to 2011's Nuvvostanante Nenoddantana and the first sequel to be produced by the Ollywood film industry. This movie is a remake of 2007 Kannada movie Milana. It was an Average grosser Odia movie.

Cast 
 Anubhav Mohanty as Shree Ram
 Barsha Priyadarshini as Shayira Banu and Bhumi 
 Dhirendra Nath
 Hari

Singers 
Udit Narayan, Human Sagar (Prema Hei Jae Re), Krishna Beaura, Abhijeet Bhatacharya, Dj Papu, Ira Mohanty.
Title Track has been sung by popular Bollywood Singer Abhijeet Bhattacharya.

References

2010s Odia-language films
Indian romantic comedy films
Odia remakes of Kannada films
2014 romantic comedy films